Bahuary is a village in the western part of Gamhariya Birta VDC in Rautahat district in Province No. 2 of the south-eastern Nepal. It consists of two wards,  (7 & 8), of the VDC.

Populated places in Rautahat District